North Arm Cove is a suburb of the Mid-Coast Council local government area in the center of the Hunter and the southern extremity of the Mid North Coast regions of New South Wales, Australia. It is located adjacent to Port Stephens and extends well north of the Pacific Highway. The suburb is sparsely populated, with most of the residents living in the southern portion of the suburb.

History

1918 subdivision 
Port Stephens was under consideration as the main seaport for New South Wales, as well as the national capital, and a large city-style subdivision of the peninsula was designed by Walter Burley Griffin.  

Unlike the previously made plans for octagonal shaped Canberra or Griffith (1914), Port Stephen City was designed to fit into the narrow finger shaped bay peninsula. It provided for various urban city functions grouped into precincts or urban zones. The major railways and rail-water interchange (the port) was planned on the western side of the peninsula, towards the Carrington village, with nearby Custom House and Administration Centre occupying the land to the East of the rail and port links. Adjacent to the north of this governance district the land was reserved for Commercial Centre and Factory District forming an employment zone of the future city. Further North there was a retail district lining the main Boulevard with Markets square and a Wholesale district conveniently located to the east of the main railway station. A Residence District was planned to the North towards the old Pacific Highway. Within the residential zone Griffin had also reserved 3 large lots for two primary school and one high school, a church site, 2 theatre sites, library centre and public recreation reserve. Plans were approved by Stroud Shire Council on 6 May 1918. 

Marion Mahony Griffin credited her husband, in her unpublished biography "Magic of America", with the identification of the locality as one of only two ‘natural seaports’ in Australia. She wrote that ‘in his innocence he interested a client, who was carrying on a considerable real estate business, in the opportunity offered at Port Stephens … It was surveyed and staked out and the allotments rapidly sold’.

During the work on survaying this land, Griffins have had their first encounter with local Australian Aboriginal people and that is where their interaction and love for Australian native vegetation has started. "Contact with the ancient peoples should awaken us to the fact that they use a different kind of thinking from ourselves an experience which, if we were open minded, would lead us on to the investigating and mastering of that kind of thinking, to take as much pains as we have taken in the mastery of rational thinking in these modern times."Plans were further extended and land further subdivided in early 1920s by Henry Halloran, well known surveyor, planner and developer at the time. 

Many dirt roads, still visible from the air, date from the original subdivision.

Land use today 
Land from the 1918 subdivision is now zoned "non-urban", meaning that construction of dwelling is not permitted under any circumstances, while other uses are allowed with permission from authorities. Consequently, land sales at North Arm Cove have been the subject of controversy for many years, even being raised as a matter in the NSW Parliament. Despite that, many blocks are purchased as an investment and/or for use as weekend retreats. Land is regularly sold and resold as owners become frustrated with being unable to develop their properties. In 2013 NSW Parliament has passed legislation for dealing with historic "paper subdivisions" (Schedule 5 to the Environmental Planning and Assessment Act 1979NSW) together with Guidelines for achieving full subdivision status.]Restrictions on land use in the area has meant that only a limited number of residential blocks are available, mostly urban sized of less than "quarter acre". The Mid-Coast Council has stated that there are no plans to rezone non-urban land for urban purposes. The local population is concentrated mainly in the village of North Arm Cove, located on the western shore of North Arm cove itself, and on the northern shore of Port Stephens. Many of the small houses that used to be in the area have been demolished and replaced with more expensive homes.

North of the Pacific Highway, land use is mainly rural, and kangaroos are wallabies are commonly found throughout the area.

Progress towards realizing Griffins' vision

North Arm Cove Initiative 

In 2019 group of landowners, with assistance from team of architect and planners from DESIM-Arch, has created "North Arm Cove Initiative". Aim of the Initiative is to promote urban development of North Arm Cove respecting planning heritage of Walter Burley and Marion Mahony Griffin and creating regenerative, resilient, sustainable community. 

One of the first activities of the Initiative was organizing an Australia-wide student research competition "Back to the future - North Arm Cove", seeking to engage the vision of young architects and planners for the future of regional urban living in Australia. The competition involved initial two weeks of lectures/online presentations by experts in heritage, urban planning, infrastructure and sustainability. The winning submission was from the "Back on Track" team.

In 2022, a peer reviewed research paper by DESIM-Arch's Tatjana Djuric-Simovic and Dejan Simovic - "Back to the future - North Arm Cove Initiative" was presented at international SEEDS Conference (Sustainable Ecological Engineering Design for Society) in Bristol, UK. The paper was awarded a High Commendation in the Project Management category. A research paper has outlined a framework for planning, designing and developing sustainable communities based on Circular Economy principles. The paper contains a PESTEL analysis of constraints and opportunities for North Arm Cove's urban development, as well as proposal for innovative, collaborative development framework through "Sustainability Research Centre - SRCe".

Authorities 
In December 2022, "Hunter Regional Plan 2041" was amended with inclusion of "PLANNING PRIORITY 6: Consider historical paper subdivisions" stating that:Local strategic planning by MidCoast Council has examined the constraints to development within paper subdivisions at North Arm Cove, Pindimar, Bundabah and Carrington, and made recommendations for future use. Preliminary analysis indicates that in many of these sites, infrastructure provision for urban development is prohibitively expensive and environmental constraints are significant.

Further investigation will identify whether options exist that could enable cost effective development.

References

External links 
North Arm Cove Community Website
North Arm Cove Rate Payers Association Website 
"A block of land called Hope: The fight to revive Walter Burley Griffin’s lost city"l 

Suburbs of Mid-Coast Council